The Best of Eighteen Visions is the third full-length album by metalcore band Eighteen Visions. Despite its title, it is not a compilation of previously-released material; all of the material was newly recorded especially for this release. Its title hints to the fact that for this release, the band chose the best material from their prior out-of-print releases and re-recorded these songs to create a new album. It also includes the newly-written song "Motionless and White".

Two songs were re-recorded from their debut EP Lifeless: "Slipping Through the Hands of God" and "Life's Blood". Five songs were re-recorded from their first full-length  album Yesterday Is Time Killed: "The Psychotic Thought", "An Old Wyoming Song", "Raping, Laughing, Tasting, Temptation", "Five 'O Six A.M. Three/Fifteen" and "Dead Rose". And all three songs from their second EP No Time for Love were re-recorded: "Russian Roulette with a Trigger Happy Manic Depressive", "Isola in the Rain" and "Diana Gone Wrong". The material was recorded between February and March 2001 with producer Jeff Forest at Doubletime Studios in Santee, California.

The Best of Eighteen Visions was released on compact disc and compact cassette on June 12, 2001 through American record label Trustkill Records and on 12" vinyl through Belgian record label Sobermind Records.

American metalcore band Motionless in White derived their name from the song "Motionless and White".

Track listing

Personnel
James Hart – lead vocals
Brandan Schieppati – guitar, backing vocals
Keith Barney – guitar, artwork, layout
Mick Morris – bass
Ken Floyd – drums

References

Eighteen Visions albums
Trustkill Records albums